The Gauteng Institute for Architecture (GIFA) is a professional membership organization for architects in Gauteng, South Africa. It promotes architecture and maintains standards within the profession, such as the registration of people in the industry under the Architectural Professions Act. This includes Architects, draughtsmen and architectural technologists. Its vision is to become a leading institute in the region and in South Africa. It organizes events, festivals and forums with architectural themes.

Its jurisdiction includes the cities of Pretoria, Johannesburg and Randburg which are some of the major cities in South Africa.  It recently organized South Africa's first week-long architectural mega-event in Johannesburg in Sept, 2010, "AZA 2010", which is set to become Africa's premier urban culture festival. It included a debate entitled, "The state of housing in SA". Gifa also awards recognition to architects and their buildings every two years.

Mission statement
GIfA is a progressive regional architectural institute, which together with its members and other built environment partners can unlock communities' access to a sustainable built environment. It recognizes the immeasurable potential of responsible architecture that unequivocally improves the quality of existence of being.

History
Established in 1900, it was formerly the Transvaal Institute of Architects. They also published the Transvaal Institute of Architects Journal.

Contemporary Presidents 

Khosto Moleko 1998-2000
Hugh Fraser 2000–2004
Kwasi Agyare-Dwomoh 2004-2006
Motsepe Fanuel 2006-2008
Clarence Kachipande 2008-2010
Mphete Morojele 2010–2012
Daniel Van Der Merwe 2012-2015 
Kumarsen Thamburan 2016-2018
Nadia Tromp 2018-(2020) Current

References

External links
 

Gauteng
Architecture-related professional associations
Architecture in South Africa
1900 establishments in South Africa
Educational institutions established in 1900